Nanxiang station or Nanxiang railway station may refer to:

 Nanxiang station (Shanghai Metro), a metro station in Shanghai, China
 , a railway station in Shanghai, China
 Nanshiang railway station (Taiwan), a railway station in Taoyuan, Taiwan